Doodlez is a Canadian animated shorts series produced for television by Cellar Door Productions, animated by Trapeze Animation Studios, which started airing on Teletoon in 2002. It was seen on Nicktoons and was one of the final programs shown on BBC Kids.

Summary
Doodlez is about Dood, a small boy who is a doodle. Dood gets himself in and out of various Duck Amuck-esque situations, with the aid of Hand, a disembodied hand that uses his pencil to draw (sometimes) helpful things onto the screen for Dood's use, such as helping Dood cheat in a skating race against his rival by drawing a booster behind Dood. Otherwise, however, Hand draws objects or people that complicate the situation and/or make things worse for Dood. Situations include girl troubles, becoming a werewolf, being stuck in a picture frame, watering a sunflower, traveling inside a giant beast to get his lollipop out of its stomach, and many other situations. There was also one episode done without Hand or his pencil, but on a computer, and Cursor (see "one-time characters" below) stood in for Hand.
Dood is usually angry at the end of the cartoon, likely because it has to end so early. There is never any spoken dialogue, but sometimes the characters communicate through gibberish and Dood sometimes has a chipmunk laugh. The end of a cartoon always shows the word "fin" (French for "the end") appearing somewhere.

Characters

Major characters
 Dood: The main character who is usually the first object to be drawn.
 Hand: The disembodied hand that holds the pencil and who draws Dood's environment.

Supporting characters

Doodette
A female version of Dood and also the love of his life.

Martini Moose
He shows up now and then, usually with a martini in hoof. He likes bubble baths and knows karate. He is seen as Dood's sidekick.

Cop
In various episodes, Cop usually squashes Dood  and throws him somewhere. After he is squashed, Dood gets handcuffed.

Penguin
Usually appears during winter.

Monster
Usually eats Dood and his things.

One-time characters
 Dood 2: An evil twin of Dood, appeared in "Genesis," an early episode of Doodlez, when Dood was cut in two by a wire and when hand copied doodles on a computer. He also starred in "Dood.com," when Dood was copied.
 Handette: A female version of Hand who has only appeared in the Valentine's Day episode.
 Referee: From when Dood and Guy race.
 Tourist: A shutterbug who also makes Dood rich for a blast of ink.
 Art vandal: A random vandal of art, enjoys drawing mustaches on every piece with a person in it.
 Bull: A bull who disappeared into a red sheet then came back for Dood to make him some coffee.
 Cursor: Replaced Hand in one episode, where the entire program was done on a computer, rather than the standard pad of paper.
 Hot-Dog Salesman: Sold Dood a hot dog in one short and also sells ice cream.
 Sound-effects guy: Followed Dood around in one episode, making various sounds to suit the mood of whatever Dood was experiencing, and to foreshadow any upcoming events.
 Director:  Appeared in an episode where Dood was featured in a movie.  He holds a clapperboard and barks as a dog in place of dialogue.
 Beaver:  Dood's enemy for one episode.

Television series
In 2007, Teletoon announced a Doodlez television series to be released soon. Because this never came out during years later, the studio probably cancelled the production, or they are still in production. An opening for the show was released on KidMango along with a bit of the classic shorts. However, they do not show the shorts anymore.

Awards and nominations

References

External links
 Doodlez at the Internet Movie Database

Canadian Screen Award-winning television shows
2000s Canadian animated television series
2002 Canadian television series debuts
2004 Canadian television series endings
Canadian children's animated comedy television series
English-language television shows
Teletoon original programming
Canadian flash animated television series
Animated television series about children
Animated television series without speech
Interstitial television shows